Priscilla Galloway (July 22, 1930 - October 28, 2018) was an award-winning Canadian children's literature author and former English teacher. She received a PhD from the University of Toronto in 1977. Her dissertation was entitled, "Sexism and the senior English literature curriculum in Ontario secondary schools."

Awards
Galloway has received the following awards and recognition for her work:
 Finalist for 1999-2000 Red Cedar Book Award for Daedalus and the Minotaur 
70th Annual New York Public Library Exhibition of Books for the Teen Age 1999 for Snake Dreamer (1999)
Mr. Christie's Book Award finalist for Daedalus and the Minotaur
Canadian Library Association Young Adult Book Award finalist for Truly Grim Tales 1996

Influences
Galloway taught English to noted literary critic Linda Hutcheon during high school.

References

Further reading

External links
Priscilla Galloway's Homepage, copy archived April 6, 2016
Priscilla Galloway at Annick Press

The archives of Pricilla Galloway (Pricilla Galloway fonds, R11736) are held at Library and Archives Canada

Canadian children's writers
Canadian women novelists
University of Toronto alumni
1930 births
Queen's University at Kingston alumni
2018 deaths
Canadian writers of young adult literature
Canadian women children's writers
Women writers of young adult literature